Ryan P. Burge is an American political scientist, statistician, and Baptist pastor. An assistant professor at Eastern Illinois University, he is best known for his work on religion in the United States. 60 Minutes has termed him one of the "leading data analysts on religion and politics" within the United States.

Views 

Burge has argued that non-religious voters represent a growing force in American politics.

He has stated:I think we’re in for a serious downsizing of American religion — wholesale denominational closures and lots and lots of churches shutting their doors in 20 or 30 years.along with: Younger people are much less religious than older people, which means the future looks completely different than the past. The future, if you’re a church, is not looking rosy for you. Objectively and empirically, that’s the fact.Burge has argued that the term "evangelical" is becoming associated with politics, particularly that of conservatism, rather than its traditional association with adherence to evangelical theology.

Bibliography 

 The Nones: Where They Came From, Who They Are, and Where They Are Going (2021)
 20 Myths about Religion and Politics in America (2022)
 The Great Dechurching: Who's Leaving, Why Are They Going, and What Will It Take to Bring Them Back? (2023)

References 

Living people
Christian religious leaders
Eastern Illinois University faculty
American political scientists
Year of birth missing (living people)